Burg or Bürg is a German, Dutch, and Jewish surname. Notable people with the surname include:

Burg
Avraham Burg (born 1955), Israeli politician, son of Yosef Burg
Eugen Burg (1871–1944), German film actor
Hansi Burg (1898–1975), Austrian-born German actress
Josef Burg (1912–2009), Jewish Soviet writer, author, publisher and journalist
Mark Burg (born 1959), American film producer and actor
Meno Burg (1789–1853), Prussian field officer
Robert Burg (1890–1946), German baritone
Yosef Burg (1909–1999), Israeli politician, father of Avraham Burg

Bürg
Johann Tobias Bürg (1766–1835), Austrian astronomer